Glen Ebon is an unincorporated community in Athens County, in the U.S. state of Ohio. The community is located at the Wayne National Forest.

History
A post office called Glen Ebon was established in 1886, and remained in operation until 1902.

References

Unincorporated communities in Athens County, Ohio
1886 establishments in Ohio
Populated places established in 1886
Unincorporated communities in Ohio